Overgaden Neden Vandet 39, is a historic property in the Christianshavn neighborhood of Copenhagen, Denmark. It is one of three properties along Christianshavn Canal that were built by anchor smith Hans Caspersen and are now all known as the Hans Caspersen House, the others being Overgaden Oven Vandet 50 and Overgaden Neden Vandet 33. The building at Sankt Annæ Gade 4 is also associated with Caspersen. The building was listed on the Danish registry of protected buildings and places in 1918.

History

17th and 18th centuries

The property was listed as No. 86 in Christianshavn Quarter in Copenhagen's first cadastre of 1689. It was that same year acquired by brewer Cornelius Nissen,  In 1701, it was sold to Friderich Svane, owner of Svenstrup Manor, who later the same year sold it to textile worker Christopher Vogt. Boldewin Depenbrock purchased the property in 1706.

A half-timbered property at the site was in 1730 purchased by dyer Diderich Rohde. It was later sold to dyer Otto Birch. His property was listed as No. 150 in the new cadastre of 1756.

The house was in 1761 acquired by anchor smith Hans Caspersen.  Caspersen replaced the half-timbered facade towards the street with one in brick and reduced the number of windows from 12 to eight larger ones. The building was a few years later hit by fire and demolished.  He purchased a house at Overgaden Oven Vandet 50 where he would live with his family until circa 1780. He completed a new four-storey building at Overgaden Neden Vandet 39 in 1777. It contained eight large apartments, two on each floor.

Hans Caspersen and the new building

Caspersen purchased the property at Overgaden Neden Vandet 33 in 1782 but remained in one of the apartments at No. 39 until a renovation of the building at No. 33 had been completed.

Later history
On 2 January 1786, Caspersen sold No. 39 to merchant Peter Halkiær. In 1792,  Halkiær sold it to Jeppe Prætorius.

The military officer Jacob Scavenius Fibiger (1793-1861) was a resident in the building in 1860–161. He had in 1851 briefly served as Defence Minister in the 3rd Cabinet of Adam Wilhelm Moltke. The theologian Peter Andreas Fenger (1799-1878), who was pastor at Church of Our Saviour from 1855, lived in the apartment on the first floor from 1873 and until his death.

C. Langes Eddikebryggeri, a manufacturer of vinegar, was at the turn of the 20th century located in the courtyard. The company changed its name to De Danske Eddikebryggerier when it relocated to Holger Danskes Vej 104 in 1902.

Architecture
The building is eight bays wide and has a four-bay central projection, The gateway is topped by a fanlight and the keystone features a relief of an ancher and the inscription "HCS AMC/150/ ANNO 1777" (HCS = Hans Caspersen Smed/ AMC = Anne Marie Caspersen. 150 = matrikel 150. Anno 1777).

List of owners
 1689-1701 Cornelius Nissen
 1701 Friderich Svane
 1701-1706 Christopher Vogt
 1706 -1730 Johann Boldewin Depenbrock
 1730-1754 Diderich Rohde
 1754-1760 Otto Birch
 1761-1786 Hans Caspersen
 1786-1792 Peder Halkiær
 1792-1859 Jeppe Prætorius and heirs

References

External links

 Source

Buildings and structures in Christianshavn
Listed residential buildings in Copenhagen
Buildings and structures completed in 1777